Johannes Constantijn "Stans" Scheffer (16 December 1914 – 12 December 1982) was a Dutch swimmer. He won a bronze medal in the 100 m backstroke event at the 1938 European Aquatics Championships, and finished seventh in the 100 m freestyle in 1934. Between 1933 and 1938 he held three national titles and 12 national records in the 100 m freestyle and 100 m and 200 m backstroke events.

Scheffer competed in the 100 m backstroke at the 1936 Summer Olympics, but failed to reach the final. On 25 January 1940 he married Nida Senff, who won the gold medal in the same event at the same Olympics. They had a son born in 1942, and earlier in 1938 published a book Wij zwemmen voor ons plezier (We swim for pleasure).

References

1914 births
1982 deaths
Dutch male freestyle swimmers
Male backstroke swimmers
Swimmers at the 1936 Summer Olympics
European Aquatics Championships medalists in swimming
Olympic swimmers of the Netherlands
Swimmers from Amsterdam
20th-century Dutch people